Loveable may refer to:

Music
"Loveable", a 1958 song recorded by Jill Corey
"Loveable (From Your Head To Your Toes)", a 2003 song by Kenny Lattimore and Chante Moore
"Lovable" (Elvis Costello song), 1986
"Loveable" (Gwen Stefani song), 2016